David Andrew Day (born 24 June 1949) is an Australian historian, academic, and author.

Academic career
The son of a weather forecaster with Australia's Bureau of Meteorology, Day grew up in Melbourne and Charleville, Queensland before commencing accounting studies in which he performed poorly owing to his political activity, which included protesting against Australia's involvement in the Vietnam War. 
After a short period of work, Day returned to his studies and graduated with first-class Honours in History and Political Science from the University of Melbourne and was awarded a PhD from the University of Cambridge. 

Day has been a Junior Research Fellow at Clare College in Cambridge, founding head of History and Political Science at Bond University, official historian of the Australian Customs Service, Keith Cameron Professor of Australian History at University College Dublin, and Professor of Australian Studies at the University of Tokyo. He is currently an Honorary Associate in the History Program at La Trobe University in Melbourne.

Career as an author
Day has written widely on Australian history and the history of the Second World War. Among his many books are Menzies and Churchill at War and a two-volume study of Anglo-Australian relations during the Second World War. His prize-winning history of Australia, Claiming a Continent, won the prestigious non-fiction prize in the 1998 South Australian Festival Awards for Literature. An earlier book, Smugglers and Sailors, was shortlisted by the Fellowship of Australian Writers for its Book of the Year Award. John Curtin: A Life was shortlisted for the 2000 NSW Premier's Literary Awards' Douglas Stewart Prize for Non-Fiction.

Published works

Sole author

 Completely revised and updated edition bringing together two earlier works: The Great Betrayal and Reluctant Nation.

The Story of a Prime Minister: Paul Keating, a Biography. Sydney: HarperCollins Australia. pp. 576. .
Maurice Blackburn: Champion of the People. Melbourne: Scribe. 2019. .

With others

References

External links
 Interview by Marshall Poe with David Day in New Books in History on 11 July 2008streaming audio interview
 Personal homepage of David Day
 Conquest: a review by Morag Fraser in The Age on 30 July 2005

Australian historians
1949 births
Living people
Academics from Melbourne
University of Melbourne alumni
Alumni of Clare College, Cambridge
Academic staff of Bond University
Academics of University College Dublin
Academic staff of the University of Tokyo
Academic staff of La Trobe University
Australian political scientists
Fellows of the Academy of the Social Sciences in Australia